Tantalum borides are compounds of tantalum and boron most remarkable for their extreme hardness.

Properties
The Vickers hardness of TaB and TaB2 films and crystals is ~30 GPa. Those materials are stable to oxidation below 700 °C and to acid corrosion.

TaB2 has the same hexagonal structure as most diborides (AlB2, MgB2, etc.). The mentioned borides have the following space groups: TaB (orthorhombic, Thallium(I) iodide-type, Cmcm), Ta5B6 (Cmmm), Ta3B4 (Immm), TaB2 (hexagonal, aluminum diboride-type, P6/mmm).

Preparation 
Single crystals of TaB, Ta5B6, Ta3B4 or TaB2 (about 1 cm diameter, 6 cm length) can be produced by the floating zone method.

Tantalum boride films can be deposited from a gas mixture of TaCl5-BCl3-H2-Ar in the temperature range 540–800 °C. TaB2 (single-phase) is deposited at a source gas flow ratio (BCl3/TaCl5) of six and a temperature above 600 °C. TaB (single-phase) is deposited at BCl3/TaCl5 = 2–4 and T = 600–700 °C.

Nanocrystals of TaB2 were successfully synthesized by the reduction of Ta2O5 with NaBH4 using a molar ratio M:B of 1:4 at 700-900 °C for 30 min under argon flow.

Ta2O5 + 6.5 NaBH4 → 2 TaB2 + 4 Na(g,l) + 2.5 NaBO2+ 13 H2(g)

References

Tantalum compounds
Borides
Superhard materials